Great Naval Battles: North Atlantic 1939–1943 was the first game in the Great Naval Battles series, published in 1992 for DOS.

Gameplay
Great Naval Battles: North Atlantic 1939–1943 was released in 1992 and depicts naval warfare in the North Atlantic during World War 2.

Reception
Computer Gaming Worlds reviewer in January 1993 stated that North Atlantic 1939–1943 was the first computer game to replicate "that 'joy of miniatures'". He cited several flaws in the gameplay but concluded that "for all the problems ... there are a half-dozen very nice features. For every minor disappointment there seem to be several glitzy positives. Frankly, I'm spending a lot of time playing it". A September 1993 review in the magazine of America in the Atlantic, Super Ships of the Atlantic, and Scenario Builder praised the latter's "infinite" replayability from the latter's random engagements, and stated that "SSI's efforts in refining and expanding this series are to be commended ... it has the potential of becoming the recognized placebo for practitioners of historical naval combat in this theater". A survey that month in the magazine of wargames gave North Atlantic, Super Ships of the Atlantic, America in the Atlantic, and Scenario Builder three-plus stars out of five. In April 1994 the magazine said that the CD version of North Atlantic 1939–1943s inclusion of all expansion disks and editors "made it a good buy for aspiring captains of the Bismarck", concluding that "It would be hard indeed to find a more comprehensive simulation of ship-to-ship naval warfare in WWII".

Reviews
ASM (Aktueller Software Markt) - Nov, 1992
PC Games (Germany) - Nov, 1992
Computer Gaming World - Sep, 1993

References

External links
Review in PC World

1992 video games
Computer wargames
DOS games
DOS-only games
Naval video games
Real-time strategy video games
Strategic Simulations games
Video games developed in the United States
World War II video games